The Leather Burners is a 1943 American Western film directed by Joseph Henabery and written by Jo Pagano. The film stars William Boyd, Andy Clyde, Jay Kirby, Victor Jory, George Givot and Ellanora Needles. The film was released on May 28, 1943, by United Artists. The on-screen title is simply Leather Burners without the definite article.

Plot

Bar 20 ranch hand Johnny Travers (Jay Kirby) sends for old friends Hopalong Cassidy (William Boyd) and California Carlson (Andy Clyde). Hopalong Cassidy immediately suspects mine company president Dan Slack (Victor Jory) to be behind the rustlings and decides to go undercover, with the assistance of Sharon Longstreet (Shelley Spencer) and her young brother Bobby (Bobby Larson).

Cast 
 William Boyd as Hopalong Cassidy
 Andy Clyde as California Carlson
 Jay Kirby as Johnny Travers
 Victor Jory as Dan Slack
 George Givot as Sam Bucktoe
 Shelley Spencer as Sharon Longstreet
 Bobby Larson as Bobby Longstreet
 George Reeves as Harrison Brooke
 Hal Taliaferro as Telegrapher Lafe
 Forbes Murray as Bart Gailey
Robert Mitchum as Henchman Randallc(Uncredited)

References

External links 
 
 
 
 

1943 films
American black-and-white films
Films directed by Joseph Henabery
United Artists films
American Western (genre) films
1943 Western (genre) films
Hopalong Cassidy films
Films scored by Samuel Kaylin
1940s English-language films
1940s American films